The Spaghetti Western is a broad subgenre of Western films produced in Europe. It emerged in the mid-1960s in the wake of Sergio Leone's film-making style and international box-office success. The term was used by foreign critics because most of these Westerns were produced and directed by Italians.

Leone's films and other core Spaghetti Westerns are often described as having eschewed, criticized, or even "demythologized" many of the conventions of traditional U.S. Westerns. This was partly intentional and partly the context of a different cultural background.

Terminology

According to veteran Spaghetti Western actor Aldo Sambrell, the phrase "Spaghetti Western" was coined by Spanish journalist Alfonso Sánchez in reference to the Italian food spaghetti. Spaghetti Westerns are also known as Italian Westerns or, primarily in Japan, Macaroni Westerns. In Italy, the genre is typically referred to as western all'italiana (Italian-style Western). Italo-Western is also used, especially in Germany.

Similar concepts 
The term Eurowesterns has been used to broadly refer to all non-Italian Western movies from Europe, including the West German Winnetou films or the Eastern Bloc Red Western films. Paella Western has been used to refer to Western films produced in Spain, taking its name from the Spanish rice dish.

Production
The majority of the films in the Spaghetti Western genre were actually international co-productions between Italy and Spain, and sometimes France, West Germany, Britain, Portugal, Greece, Israel, Yugoslavia, or the United States. Over six hundred European Westerns were made between 1960 and 1978.

These movies were originally released in Italian or with Italian dubbing, but as most of the films featured multilingual casts and sound was post-synched, most "western all'italiana" do not have an official dominant language.

The typical Spaghetti Western team was made up of an Italian director, Italo-Spanish technical staff, and a cast of Italian, Spanish, and (sometimes) West German and American actors.

Filming locations

Most Spaghetti Westerns filmed between 1964 and 1978 were made on low budgets and shot at Cinecittà studios and various locations around southern Italy and Spain. Many of the stories take place in the dry landscapes of the American Southwest and Northern Mexico, hence common filming locations were the Tabernas Desert and the Cabo de Gata-Níjar Natural Park, an area of volcanic origin known for its wide sandy beaches, both of which are in the Province of Almería in southeastern Spain. Some sets and studios built for Spaghetti Westerns survive as theme parks, such as Texas Hollywood, Mini Hollywood, and Western Leone, and continue to be used as film sets. Other filming locations used were in central and southern Italy, such as the parks of Valle del Treja (between Rome and Viterbo), the area of Camposecco (next to Camerata Nuova, characterized by a karst topography), the hills around Castelluccio, the area around the Gran Sasso mountain, and the Tivoli's quarries and Sardinia. God's Gun was filmed in Israel.

Context and origins

Early European Westerns
European Westerns are as old as filmmaking itself. The Lumière brothers had their first public screening of films in 1895 and already in 1896 Gabriel Veyre shot Repas d'Indien ("Indian Banquet") for them. Joe Hamman starred as Arizona Bill in films made in the French horse country of Camargue 1911–1912.

In Italy, the American West as a dramatic setting for spectacles goes back at least as far as Giacomo Puccini's 1910 opera La fanciulla del West (“The Girl of the West”) it is sometimes considered to be the first Spaghetti Western.
The first Western movie made in Italy was La voce del sangue produced by Turin's film studio Itala Film (1910). In 1913 appeared La vampira Indiana—a combination of Western and vampire film. It was directed by Vincenzo Leone, father of Sergio Leone, and starred his mother Bice Waleran in the title role as Indian princess Fatale. The Italians also made Wild Bill Hickok films, while the Germans released back-woods Westerns featuring Bela Lugosi as Uncas.

Of the Western-related European films before 1964, the one attracting most attention is probably Luis Trenker's Der Kaiser von Kalifornien (1936), about John Sutter. Another Italian western was Girl of the Golden West (1942). The film's title alludes to the opera The Girl of the Golden West by Giacomo Puccini, but is not an adaptation of it. It was one of only a handful of Westerns to be made during the silent and Fascist eras. Forerunners of the genre was also Giorgio Ferroni's Il fanciullo del West (The Boy in the West, 1943) and Fernando Cerchio's Il bandolero stanco (1952), starring respectively Erminio Macario and Renato Rascel.

After the Second World War, there were scattered European uses of Western settings, mostly for comedy or musical comedy. A cycle of Western comedies was initiated in 1959 with La sceriffa and Il terrore dell’Oklahoma, followed by other films starring comedy specialists like Walter Chiari, Ugo Tognazzi, Raimondo Vianello or Fernandel. An Italian critic has compared these comedies to American Bob Hope vehicles.

Origins of the Spaghetti Western

The first American-British western filmed in Spain was The Sheriff of Fractured Jaw (1958), directed by Raoul Walsh. It was followed in 1961 by Savage Guns, a British-Spanish western, again filmed in Spain. This marked the beginning of Spain as a suitable film shooting location for any kind of European western. In 1961 an Italian company co-produced the French Taste of Violence, with a Mexican Revolution theme. In 1963, three non-comedy Italo-Spanish westerns were produced: Gunfight at Red Sands, Implacable Three and Gunfight at High Noon.

In 1965, Bruno Bozzetto released his traditionally animated feature film West and Soda, a Western parody with a marked Spaghetti Western-theme; despite having been released a year after Sergio Leone's seminal Spaghetti Western A Fistful of Dollars, development of West and Soda actually began a year earlier than Fistful'''s and lasted longer, mainly because of the use of more time-demanding animation over regular acting. For this reason, Bozzetto himself claims to have invented the Spaghetti Western genre.

Since there is no real consensus about where to draw the exact line between Spaghetti Westerns and other Eurowesterns (or other Westerns in general) one cannot say which one of the films mentioned so far was the first Spaghetti Western. However, 1964 saw the breakthrough of this genre, with more than twenty productions or co-productions from Italian companies, and more than half a dozen Westerns by Spanish or Spanish/American companies. Furthermore, by far the most commercially successful of this lot was Sergio Leone's A Fistful of Dollars. It was the innovations in cinematic style, music, acting and story of Leone's first Western that decided that Spaghetti Westerns became a distinct subgenre and not just a number of films looking like American Westerns.

A Fistful of Dollars and its impact
In this seminal film, Leone used a distinct visual style with large face close ups to tell the story of a hero entering a town that is ruled by two outlaw gangs, and ordinary social relations are non-existent. The hero betrays and plays the gangs against one another in order to make money. He then uses his cunning and exceptional weapons skill to assist a family threatened by both gangs. His treachery is exposed and he is severely beaten, but in the end, he defeats the remaining gang. The interactions in this story range between cunning and irony (the tricks, deceits, unexpected actions and sarcasm of the hero) on the one hand, and pathos (terror and brutality against defenseless people and against the hero after his double-cross has been revealed) on the other. Ennio Morricone's innovative score expresses a similar duality between quirky and unusual sounds and instruments on the one hand and sacral dramatizing for the big confrontation scenes on the other. Another important novelty was Clint Eastwood's performance as the man with no name—an unshaven, sarcastic, insolent Western antihero set on his own gain, with distinct visuals to boot—the squint, the cigarillo, the poncho.

The Spaghetti Western was born, flourished and faded in a highly commercial production environment. The Italian "low" popular film production was usually low-budget and low-profit, and the easiest way to success was imitating a proven success. When the typically low-budget production A Fistful of Dollars turned into a remarkable box office success, the industry eagerly lapped up its innovations. Most succeeding Spaghetti Westerns tried to get a ragged, laconic hero with superhuman weapon skill, preferably one who looked like Clint Eastwood: Franco Nero, John Garko and Terence Hill started out that way; Anthony Steffen and others stayed that way all their Spaghetti Western careers.

Whoever the hero was, he would join an outlaw gang to further his own secret agenda, as in A Pistol for Ringo, Blood for a Silver Dollar, Vengeance Is a Dish Served Cold, Renegade Riders and others, while Beyond the Law instead has a bandit infiltrate society and become a sheriff. There would be a flamboyant Mexican bandit (Gian Maria Volonté from A Fistful of Dollars, otherwise Tomas Milian or most often Fernando Sancho) and a grumpy old man—more often than not an undertaker, to serve as sidekick for the hero. For love interest, rancher's daughters, schoolmarms and barroom maidens were overshadowed by young Latin women desired by dangerous men, where actresses like Nicoletta Machiavelli or Rosalba Neri carried on Marianne Koch's role of Marisol in the Leone film. The terror of the villains against their defenseless victims became just as ruthless as in A Fistful of Dollars, or more, and their brutalization of the hero when his treachery is disclosed became just as merciless, or more—just like the cunning used to secure the latter's retribution.

In the beginning some films mixed some of these new devices with the borrowed US Western devices typical for most of the 1963–64 Spaghetti Westerns. For example, in Sergio Corbucci's Minnesota Clay (1964) that appeared two months after A Fistful of Dollars, an American style "tragic gunfighter" hero confronts two evil gangs, one Mexican and one Anglo, and (just as in A Fistful of Dollars) the leader of the latter is the town sheriff.

In the same director's Johnny Oro (1966) a traditional Western sheriff and a mixed-race bounty killer are forced into an uneasy alliance when Mexican bandits and Native Americans together assault the town. In A Pistol for Ringo a traditional sheriff commissions a money-oriented hero played by Giuliano Gemma (as deadly but with more pleasing manners than Eastwood's character) to infiltrate a gang of Mexican bandits whose leader is played typically by Fernando Sancho.

Further developments of the genre
Just like Leone's first Western, the following works in his  Dollars Trilogy — For a Few Dollars More (1965) and The Good, the Bad and the Ugly (1966) — strongly influenced the further developments of the genre, as did Sergio Corbucci's Django and Enzo Barboni's two Trinity films, as well as some other successful Spaghetti Westerns.

For a Few Dollars More and unstable partnerships

After 1965 when Leone's second Western For a Few Dollars More brought a larger box office success, the profession of bounty hunter became the choice of occupation of Spaghetti Western heroes in films like Arizona Colt, Vengeance Is Mine, Ten Thousand Dollars for a Massacre, The Ugly Ones, Dead Men Don't Count and Any Gun Can Play. In The Great Silence and A Minute to Pray, a Second to Die, the heroes instead fight bounty killers. During this era, many heroes and villains in Spaghetti Westerns began carrying a musical watch, after its ingenious use in For a Few Dollars More.

Spaghetti Westerns also began featuring a pair of different heroes.  In Leone's film Eastwood's character is an unshaven bounty hunter, dressed similarly to his character in A Fistful of Dollars, who enters an unstable partnership with Colonel Mortimer (Lee Van Cleef), an older bounty killer who uses more sophisticated weaponry and wears a suit, and in the end turns out to also be an avenger. In the following years there was a deluge of Spaghetti Westerns with a pair of heroes with (most often) conflicting motives. Examples include: a lawman and an outlaw (And the Crows Will Dig Your Grave), an army officer and an outlaw (Bury Them Deep), an avenger and a (covert) army officer (The Hills Run Red), an avenger and a (covert) guilty party (Viva! Django aka W Django!), an avenger and a con-man (The Dirty Outlaws), an outlaw posing as a sheriff and a bounty hunter (Man With the Golden Pistol aka Doc, Hands of Steel) and an outlaw posing as his twin and a bounty hunter posing as a sheriff (A Few Dollars for Django).

The theme of age in For a Few Dollars More, where the younger bounty killer learns valuable lessons from his more experienced colleague and eventually becomes his equal, is taken up in Day of Anger and Death Rides a Horse. In both cases Lee Van Cleef carries on as the older hero versus Giuliano Gemma and John Phillip Law, respectively.

Zapata Westerns

One variant of the hero pair was a revolutionary Mexican bandit and a mostly money-oriented American from the United States frontier. These films are sometimes called Zapata Westerns. The first was Damiano Damiani's A Bullet for the General and then followed Sergio Sollima's trilogy: The Big Gundown, Face to Face and Run, Man, Run.

Sergio Corbucci's The Mercenary and Compañeros and Tepepa by Giulio Petroni are also considered Zapata Westerns. Many of these films enjoyed both good takes at the box office and attention from critics. They are often interpreted as a leftist critique of the typical Hollywood handling of the Mexican Revolution, and of imperialism in general.

The Good, the Bad and the Ugly and universal betrayal

In Leone's The Good, the Bad and the Ugly there is still the scheme of a pair of heroes vs. a villain but it is somewhat relaxed, as here all three parties were driven by a money motive. In subsequent films like Any Gun Can Play (which's Italian title, "Vado... l'ammazzo e torno", is itself a quote from Leone's masterpiece), One Dollar Too Many and Kill Them All and Come Back Alone several main characters repeatedly form alliances and betray each other for monetary gain.Sabata and If You Meet Sartana Pray for Your Death, directed by Gianfranco Parolini, introduce into similar betrayal environments a kind of hero molded on the Mortimer character from For a Few Dollars More, only without any vengeance motive and with more outrageous trick weapons. Fittingly enough Sabata is portrayed by Lee Van Cleef himself, while John Garko plays the very similar Sartana protagonist. Parolini made some more Sabata movies while Giuliano Carnimeo made a whole series of Sartana films with Garko.

Django and the tragic hero
Beside the first three Spaghetti Westerns by Leone, a most influential film was Sergio Corbucci's Django starring Franco Nero.  Django was one of the most violent Spaghetti Westerns. The titular character is torn between several motives – money or revenge – and his choices bring misery to him and to a woman close to him. Indicative of this film's influence on the Spaghetti Western style, "Django" is the hero's name in a plenitude of subsequent westerns.

Even though his character is not named Django, Franco Nero brings a similar ambience to Texas, Adios and Massacre Time where the hero must confront surprising and dangerous family relations. Similar "prodigal son" stories followed, including Chuck Moll, Keoma, The Return of Ringo, The Forgotten Pistolero, One Thousand Dollars on the Black, Johnny Hamlet and also Seven Dollars on the Red.

Another type of wronged hero is set up and must clear himself from accusations. Giuliano Gemma starred in a series of successful films carrying this theme – Adiós gringo, For a Few Extra Dollars, Long Days of Vengeance, Wanted, and to some extent Blood for a Silver Dollar – where most often his character is called "Gary".

The wronged hero who becomes an avenger appears in many Spaghetti Westerns. Among the more commercially successful films with a hero dedicated to vengeance – For a Few Dollars More, Once Upon a Time in the West, Today We Kill... Tomorrow We Die!, A Reason to Live, a Reason to Die, Death Rides a Horse, Django, Prepare a Coffin, The Deserter, Hate for Hate, Halleluja for Django – those with whom he cooperates typically have conflicting motivations.

The "Trinity" films and triumph of comedy

In 1968, the wave of Spaghetti Westerns reached its crest, comprising one-third of the Italian film production, only to collapse to one-tenth in 1969. However, the considerable box office success of Enzo Barboni's They Call Me Trinity and the pyramidal one of its follow-up Trinity Is Still My Name gave Italian filmmakers a new model to emulate. The main characters were played by Terence Hill and Bud Spencer, who had already cooperated as hero pair in earlier Spaghetti Westerns God Forgives... I Don't!, Boot Hill and Ace High directed by Giuseppe Colizzi. The humor started in those movies already, with scenes with comedy fighting, but the Barboni films became burlesque comedies. They feature the quick but lazy Trinity (Hill) and his big, strong and irritable brother Bambino (Spencer).

The stories lampoon stereotypical Western characters such as diligent farmers, lawmen and bounty hunters. There was a wave of Trinity-inspired films with quick and strong heroes, the former kind often called Trinity or perhaps coming from "a place called Trinity", and with no or few killings. Because the two model stories contained religious pacifists to account for the absence of gunplay, all the successors contained religious groups or at least priests, sometimes as one of the heroes.

The music for the two Trinity westerns (composed by Franco Micalizzi and Guido & Maurizio De Angelis, respectively) also reflected the change into a lighter and more sentimental mood. The Trinity-inspired films also adopted this less serious and often maligned style.

Some critics deplore these post-Trinity films and their soundtracks as a degeneration of the "real" Spaghetti Westerns. Indeed, Hill's and Spencer's skillful use of body language was a hard act to follow and it is significant that the most successful of the post-Trinity films featured Hill (Man of the East, A Genius, Two Partners and a Dupe), Spencer (It Can Be Done Amigo) and a pair of Hill/Spencer look-alikes in Carambola. Spaghetti Western old hand Franco Nero also worked in this subgenre with Cipolla Colt and Tomas Milian plays an outrageous "quick" bounty hunter modeled on Charlie Chaplin's Little Tramp in Sometimes Life Is Hard, Eh Providence? and Here We Go Again, Eh, Providence?Twilight of the genre
In 1975, Terence Hill still could draw large audiences in the post-Trinity caper story Western A Genius, Two Partners and a Dupe, and the following year Franco Nero achieved likewise as a Django-style hero in Keoma. However, by the end of the 1970s, the different types of Spaghetti Westerns had lost their following among mainstream cinema audiences and the production had ground to a virtual halt. Belated attempts  to revive the genre included the comedy film Buddy Goes West (1981), the Spanish-American coproduction Comin' at Ya! (also 1981) shot in 3D, and Django Strikes Again (1987).

Other notable themes in Spaghetti Westerns
"Cult" Spaghetti Westerns
Some movies that were not very successful at the box office still earn a "cult" status in some segment of the audience because of certain exceptional features in story and/or presentation. One "cult" Spaghetti Western that also has drawn attention from critics is Giulio Questi's Django Kill. Other "cult" items are Cesare Canevari's Matalo!, Tony Anthony's Blindman and Joaquín Luis Romero Marchent's Cut-Throats Nine (the latter among gore film audiences).

Historical backgrounds
The few Spaghetti Westerns containing historical characters like Buffalo Bill, Wyatt Earp, Billy the Kid etc. mainly appear before A Fistful of Dollars had put its mark on the genre. Likewise, and in contrast to the contemporary German Westerns, few films feature Native Americans. When they appear they are more often portrayed as victims of discrimination than as dangerous foes. The only fairly successful Spaghetti Western with a Native American main character (played by Burt Reynolds in his only European Western outing) is Sergio Corbucci's Navajo Joe, where the (supposedly) Navajo village is wiped out by bandits during the first minutes, and the avenger hero spends the rest of the film dealing mostly with Anglos and Mexicans until the final showdown at a Native American burial ground.

Ancient myths and classic literature

Several Spaghetti Westerns are inspired by classical myths and dramas. Titles like Fedra West (also called Ballad of a Bounty Hunter) and Johnny Hamlet signify the connection to Greek myth and possibly the plays by Euripides and Racine and the play by William Shakespeare, respectively. The latter also inspired Dust in the Sun (1972), which follows its original more closely than Johnny Hamlet, where the hero survives. The Forgotten Pistolero is based on the vengeance of Orestes. There are similarities between the story of The Return of Ringo and the last canto of Homer's Odyssey. Fury of Johnny Kid follows Shakespeare's Romeo and Juliet, but (again) with a different ending—the loving couple leave together while their families annihilate each other.

Spaghetti Western musicals
Some Italian Western films were made as vehicles for musical stars, like Ferdinando Baldi's Rita of the West featuring Rita Pavone and Terence Hill. In non-singing roles were Ringo Starr as a villain in Blindman and French rock 'n' roll veteran Johnny Hallyday as the gunfighter/avenger hero in Sergio Corbucci's The Specialists.

East Asian connections
The story of A Fistful of Dollars was closely based on Akira Kurosawa's Yojimbo. Kurosawa sued Sergio Leone for plagiarism, and was compensated with the exclusive distribution rights to the movie in Japan, where its hero, Clint Eastwood, was already a huge star due to the popularity of the TV series Rawhide. Leone would have done far better financially by obtaining Kurosawa's advance permission to use Yojimbo's script.An agreement was signed to compensate the authors of Yojimbo for the resemblance. See Frayling (2000) pp. 148–49. Requiem for a Gringo shows many traces from another well-known Japanese film, Masaki Kobayashi's Harakiri.

When Asian martial arts films started to draw crowds in European cinema houses, the producers of Spaghetti Westerns tried to hang on, this time not by adapting story-lines but rather by directly including martial arts in the films, performed by Eastern actors—for example Chen Lee in My Name Is Shanghai Joe or Lo Lieh teaming up with Lee Van Cleef in The Stranger and the Gunfighter.

Political allegories

Some Spaghetti Westerns incorporated political overtones, particularly from the political left. An example of such a film is Requiescant, featuring Italian author/film director Pier Paolo Pasolini as a major supporting character. Pasolini's character is a priest who espouses Liberation theology. The film concerns oppression of poor Mexicans by rich Anglos and ends on a call for arms but it does not fit easily as a Zapata Western, as it lacks the typical hero pair of a flamboyant Latin revolutionary and an Anglo specialist. The Price of Power serves a political allegory about the assassination of John F. Kennedy, and racism. The movie concerns the assassination of an American president in Dallas, Texas by a group of Southern white supremacists who frame an innocent African American. They are opposed by an unstable partnership between a whistle-blower (Giuliano Gemma) and a political aide.

Sexuality in the Spaghetti Western
Though the Spaghetti Westerns from A Fistful of Dollars and on featured more violence and killings than earlier American Western films, they generally shared the parental genre's restrictive attitude toward explicit sexuality. However, in response to the growing commercial success of various shades of sex films, there was a greater exposure of naked skin in some Spaghetti Westerns, among others Dead Men Ride (1971) and Heads or Tails (1969). In the former and partly the latter, the sex scenes feature coercion and violence against women.

Even though it is hinted at in some films, like Django Kill and Requiescant, open homosexuality plays a marginal part in Spaghetti Westerns. The exception is Giorgio Capitani's The Ruthless Four – in effect a gay version of John Huston's The Treasure of the Sierra Madre – where the explicit homosexual relation between two of its male main characters and some gay cueing scenes are embedded with other forms of man-to-man relations through the story.

Reception
In the 1960s, critics recognized that the American genres were rapidly changing. The genre most identifiably American, the Western, seemed to be evolving into a new, rougher form. For many critics, Sergio Leone's films were part of the problem. Leone's Dollars Trilogy (1964–1966) was not the beginning of the "Spaghetti Western" cycle in Italy, but for some Americans Leone's films represented the true beginning of the Italian invasion of an American genre.

Christopher Frayling, in his noted book on the Italian Western, describes American critical reception of the Spaghetti Western cycle as, to "a large extent, confined to a sterile debate about the 'cultural roots' of the American/Hollywood Western." He remarks that few critics dared admit that they were, in fact, "bored with an exhausted Hollywood genre."

Pauline Kael, Frayling notes, was willing to acknowledge this critical ennui and thus appreciate how a film such as Akira Kurosawa's Yojimbo (1961) "could exploit the conventions of the Western genre, while debunking its morality." Frayling and other film scholars such as Bondanella argue that this revisionism was the key to Leone's success and, to some degree, to that of the Spaghetti Western genre as a whole.

Legacy

Spaghetti Westerns have left their mark on popular culture, strongly influencing numerous works produced in and outside of Italy. In later years there were "return of stories" Django Strikes Again with Franco Nero and Troublemakers with Terence Hill and Bud Spencer. Clint Eastwood's first American Western film, Hang 'Em High (1968), incorporates elements of Spaghetti Westerns.

American director Quentin Tarantino has utilized elements of Spaghetti Westerns in his films Kill Bill (combined with kung fu movies), Inglourious Basterds (set in Nazi-occupied France), Django Unchained (set in the American South during the time of slavery), The Hateful Eight (set in Wyoming post-US Civil War), and Once Upon a Time in Hollywood (about fictional American actor Rick Dalton sometimes working in Spaghetti Westerns).

The Back to the Future trilogy pays homage to Spaghetti Westerns (especially Sergio Leone's Dollars Trilogy) on a variety of occasions, most notably in the third film. The American animated film Rango incorporates elements of Spaghetti Westerns, including a character (the mystical "Spirit of the West", regarded as a sort of deity among the characters) appearing to the protagonist as an elderly Man with No Name. The 1985 Japanese film Tampopo was promoted as a "ramen Western". Japanese director Takashi Miike paid tribute to the genre with Sukiyaki Western Django, a Western set in Japan which derives influence from both Django and the Dollars Trilogy.

The Bollywood film Sholay (1975) was often referred to as a "Curry Western". A more accurate genre label for the film is the "Dacoit Western", as it combined the conventions of Indian dacoit films such as Mother India (1957) and Gunga Jumna (1961) with that of Spaghetti Westerns. Sholay spawned its own genre of "Dacoit Western" films in Bollywood during the 1970s.

In the Soviet Union, the Spaghetti Western was adapted into the Ostern ("Eastern") genre of Soviet films. The Wild West setting was replaced by an Eastern setting in the steppes of the Caucasus, while Western stock characters such as "cowboys and Indians" were replaced by Caucasian stock characters such as bandits and harems. A famous example of the genre was White Sun of the Desert (1970), which was popular in the Soviet Union.

American heavy metal band Metallica has used Ennio Morricone's composition "The Ecstasy of Gold" from The Good, the Bad and the Ugly to open several of their concerts. The Australian band The Tango Saloon combines elements of Tango music with influences from Spaghetti Western scores. The band Ghoultown also derives influence from Spaghetti Westerns. The music video for the song "Knights of Cydonia" by the English rock band Muse was influenced by Spaghetti Westerns. The band Big Audio Dynamite used music samples from Spaghetti Westerns when mixing their song "Medicine Show". Within the song one can hear samples from Spaghetti Western movies such as A Fistful of Dollars, The Good, the Bad and the Ugly, and Duck, You Sucker!.

Video game studio Rockstar Games utilized aspects of the Spaghetti Western and paid homage to it in their series Red Dead Redemption along with its predecessor, Red Dead Revolver.

Retrospective of the Venice Film Festival

In 2007 a retrospective took place, as part of the Venice International Film Festival, to pay homage to the genre. The retrospective included 32 films:The Seven from Texas (1964) by Joaquin Luis Romero Marchent100.000 dollari per Ringo (1965) by Alberto De MartinoThe Return of Ringo (1965) by Duccio TessariSavage Gringo (1965) by Mario Bava and Antonio RománBlood for a Silver Dollar (1965) by Giorgio FerroniDjango (1965) - Full version - by Sergio CorbucciThe Ugly Ones (1966) by Eugenio MartinThe Big Gundown (1966) by Sergio SollimaNavajo Joe (1966) by Sergio CorbucciSugar Colt (1966) by Franco GiraldiThe Hills Run Red (1966) by Carlo LizzaniYankee (1966) by Tinto BrassTen Thousand Dollars for a Massacre (1967) by Romolo GuerrieriThe Dirty Outlaws (1967) by Franco RossettiIl tempo degli avvoltoi (1967) by Nando CiceroLa morte non conta i dollari (1967) by Riccardo FredaDjango Kill... If You Live, Shoot! (1967) - Full version - by Giulio QuestiThe Ruthless Four (1967) by Giorgio CapitaniDjango, Prepare a Coffin (1967) by Ferdinando BaldiTepepa (1968) by Giulio PetroniA Noose for Django (1968) by Sergio GarroneAnd God Said to Cain (1969) by Antonio MargheritiThe Reward's Yours... The Man's Mine (1969) by Edoardo MulargiaThey Call Me Trinity (1970) by Enzo BarboniMatalo! (1970) by Cesare CanevariCompañeros (1970) by Sergio CorbucciVengeance Is a Dish Served Cold (1971) by Pasquale SquitieriThe Grand Duel (1972) by Giancarlo SantiThe Fighting Fist of Shanghai Joe (1973) by Mario CaianoA Reason to Live, a Reason to Die (1973) by Tonino ValeriiFour of the Apocalypse (1975) by Lucio FulciKeoma (1976) by Enzo Castellari

 See also 

 List of Spaghetti Western filmmakers
 Cinema of Italy
 List of Spaghetti Western films
 Co-productions in Spanish cinema
 Ostern
 Revisionist Western
 ZWAM, a youth movement in Madagascar inspired by Spaghetti Westerns
 Bang! (card game), inspired by the genre

Notes

References
 
 
 Frayling, Christopher: Sergio Leone: Something to Do with Death (London: Faber, 2000)
 Fridlund, Bert: The Spaghetti Western. A Thematic Analysis. Jefferson, NC and London: McFarland & Company Inc., 2006. Print.
 
Liehm, Mira. Passion and Defiance: Film in Italy from 1942 to the Present. Berkeley: U of California P, 1984. Print.

Riling, Yngve P, The Spaghetti Western Bible. Limited Edition, (Riling, 2011). Print
Weisser, Thomas, Spaghetti Westerns: the Good, the Bad and the Violent — 558 Eurowesterns and Their Personnel'', 1961–1977. (Jefferson, N.C.: McFarland, 1992)

External links 

 The Spaghetti Western Database
 10,000 Ways to Die, a book about Spaghetti Westerns made between 1963 and 1973, released under a Creative Commons license by its author Alex Cox

Spaghetti Western

Exploitation films
Film genres
Western
Metaphors referring to spaghetti
Western (genre) films by genre
Western (genre) subgenres